The Rodil is a river in northern Spain flowing through the Autonomous Communities of Asturias and Galicia.  It rises in the Asturian mountains.

See also
 Rivers of Galicia

Rivers of Asturias
Rivers of Spain
Rivers of Galicia (Spain)